Jarmila Gajdošová was the defending champion, but chose to participate at the 2015 Western & Southern Open instead.

Johanna Konta won the title, defeating Kirsten Flipkens in the final, 6–2, 6–4.

Seeds

Main draw

Finals

Top half

Bottom half

References 
 Main draw

Odlum Brown Vancouver Open
Vancouver Open